The Illustrated Family Doctor is a 2005 Australian film. At the ARIA Music Awards of 2005 the soundtrack won the ARIA Award for Best Original Soundtrack, Cast or Show Album.

Track listing
 "Pour Chiens Moyens" - 5:50
 "Chiens Annex" - 1:22
 "Mosquito" - 6:14
 "Starts With K" - 4:31
 "Snakes Triumphant" - 2:05
 "Moon Pie" - 5:59
 "AAA Mr Hot Water" - 6:25
 "Ballet Suharto L Dopa" - 5:28
 "Automated Fanfare" - 6:37
 "The Big One" - 2:56
 "Runaway Christine" - 1:36
 "Street Apparitions" - 1:46
 "Teeth x3 Orthodontist" - 1:36
 "Dead Cowboys" - 1:58
 "Awake " - 0:42
 "Escape" - 3:49
 "Maudlin Baubles" - 6:43
 "Your Kidneys (With Dr. Cherry) - 3:04

References

External links

Illustrated Family Doctor at At the Movies
The Illustrated Family Doctor at Urban Cinefile

2005 films
ARIA Award-winning albums
Australian black comedy films
2005 black comedy films
Films directed by David Caesar
Films directed by Kriv Stenders
2005 directorial debut films
2000s English-language films
2000s Australian films